Ria Brodell is an American artist, educator and author based in Boston.

Early life and education 
Brodell was born in Buffalo, New York and raised in Boise, Idaho. Brodell attended the School of the Art Institute of Chicago and received a BFA from Cornish College of the Arts in Seattle, WA and an MFA from the School of the Museum of Fine Arts at Tufts University in Boston, MA.

Career 
Brodell has had solo and group exhibitions throughout the United States, including the Cornell Fine Arts Museum, the Davis Museum at Wellesley College, the Minnesota Museum of American Art, the DeCordova Museum and Sculpture Park, the Museum of Fine Arts, Boston among others. Their work can be found in the collections of the Cornell Fine Arts Museum in Winter Park, FL, the Minnesota Museum of American Art in St. Paul, MN, the Henry Art Gallery in Seattle, WA, the Leslie-Lohman Museum of Gay and Lesbian Art in NYC, the Davis Museum at Wellesley College, the Bernard A. Zuckerman Museum of Art, Kennesaw, GA and the Mary Alice Cooley Print Collection at Cornish College of the Arts, Seattle, WA. Brodell’s work has appeared in The Guardian, ARTNews, The Boston Globe, New American Paintings, and Art New England. Brodell’s book documenting their painting series Butch Heroes was released in 2018 via MIT Press.

Artworks

The Handsome and the Holy
The Handsome and The Holy is a series of self-portraits and vignettes by Ria Brodell made from 2008-2010. The works in this series were painted with gouache on paper. In this series the artist attempted to bring together seemingly contradictory aspects of their childhood- queer sexuality, struggles with gender identity, family and Catholicism. In a Q&A article written by Jess T. Dugan for Strange Fire, Brodell states, “The Handsome and the Holy was the first time I tried to tackle the subject of my gender identity, sexuality and Catholic upbringing through painting. In that series I was reaching back to my childhood. As a kid, part of me knew that something was “queer” about who I was attracted to, and who I wanted to be (Cary Grant, Ken, the Prince in all the Disney movies), but I didn’t have the language or the knowledge to understand what that meant. The way I wanted to express my gender (in the most masculine ways possible) did not mesh well with having to wear a little plaid skirt to school.”

Like The Handsome and the Holy, the Butch Heroes series seeks to depict role models and possible heroes throughout history that were gender nonconforming and tell their stories. Brodell does this through the style of Catholic holy cards - intricate depictions of saints or martyrs that tell a visual story and are meant for “private, portable devotions.” Both of these series deal with Brodell’s Catholic upbringing “‘in relationship to [their] gender and sexuality and coming out and coming to terms with all that,’ said Brodell…” in their book, Butch Heroes. In the book titled We Are Everywhere by Matthew Reimer it says, “The strong sister told the strong brother that there were two important things to remember about coming revolutions… The first is that we will get our asses kicked and the second is that we will win.” It is here that Ria Brodell is winning and giving others hope and a chance to win as well.

Self-Portrait as a Nun or a Monk, ca. 1250 
This piece is a work from their series The Handsome and the Holy and was painted in 2010. It contains two self-representative images: one of a nun, and one of a monk. This piece was exhibited in Brodell’s first solo museum exhibition, Devotion, at the Cornell Fine Arts Museum from January to May 2018. It was exhibited alongside other pieces from their series The Handsome and the Holy and Butch Heroes. This work led them to research queer historical figures that were assigned female at birth, but masculine presenting, and eventually to pursue the well-known Butch Heroes series. Brodell discusses their shift from self-portraits to historical storytelling in an interview in 2016:

“Self-Portrait as a Nun or a Monk, ca. 1250” is a self-reflection and an inquiry into the history of queer bodies and their treatment. This painting is a statement on the criminalization and condemnation of queer people and a look into lives of the past. It is a bridge between these two series and between the inner reflection and external realities of the past and present world.

Butch Heroes 
Ria Brodell’s most popular series, Butch Heroes, began in 2010 following the making of their work Self Portrait as a Nun or a Monk, circa 1250. Brodell began the process by wondering what their life would have been like had they been born in a different century. In creating the Butch Heroes series, Brodell paints images that remain true to Catholic holy cards by centering “the featured individual or couple” and including “details of symbolic significance, such as a location” or a meaningful object. The works in this series all follow a similar style with the use of “bright and contrasting colors” alongside “bold designs” to capture the audience's attention. All of the paintings also include a gold banner with the “name(s) and date(s) associated with the subject(s)". Some of the many people included in this series include Katherina Hetzeldorfer, Lisbetha Olsdotter, and Okuhara Seiko.

The paintings depict, “people who were assigned female at birth, had documented relationships with women, and whose gender presentation was more masculine than feminine.” Brodell explains,“Some of the subjects identified as women, others as men; some shifted between gender presentations throughout their lives, while others embodied both simultaneously.” Original and secondary sources, including newspaper articles, and personal journal entries are used to verify the information. Summarized narratives and research sources are included with each portrait so that others can do further research. The paintings are created in the style of Catholic holy cards as an homage to Brodell's Catholic upbringing.  Brodell explains the use of the holy card format:

Brodell views the project as an ongoing effort to reclaim and document the history of LGBTQIA community. The Butch Heroes paintings were first exhibited in March–April 2017 at Gallery Kayafas in Boston. Images of the paintings, accompanying narratives and source material were published by the artist as a limited edition book, Butch Heroes: Paintings by Ria Brodell, in conjunction with the exhibition. In February 2018, the Davis Museum at Wellesley College released a limited edition Butch Heroes boxed card set. In October 2018 the MIT Press version, Butch Heroes, was released with additional paintings and narratives.

Since its release the book has been described as "an ambitious and wonderfully celebratory ode to the lives of 28 people over many centuries 'assigned female at birth' who 'had documented relationships with women, and whose gender presentation was more masculine than feminine... This is a serious—and seriously successful—queer history recovery project." "Butch Heroes is a fascinating, intersectional, feminist art-text project, and overall a rather wonderful reclamatory book of LGBT history that subvert and resonates in the human psyche." "The portraits give homage to contemporary ideas of queer ancestry, and in doing so give strength to trans and non-binary communities currently under attack. That makes Butch Heroes worth celebrating."

Kingdom Animalia 
The Kingdom Animalia Project is a series of artwork made by artist Ria Brodell from December 15, 1015 through March 1, 2017. By drawing a different animal every day, Brodell was able to gain insight into “the magnitude of animal species around the world." In a 2016 interview with Jess Dugan, Brodell explained that this project stemmed from their “strong interest in animal rights and conservation” and by July 2016, the series contained over 200 pieces. Brodell also mentioned that this project allowed them to continually practice drawing and to focus mentally. Some of the many species that Brodell drew include a variety of different insects, reptiles, birds, sea creatures, and mammals. The works in this project are completed on small pieces of paper using colored pencils or gouache for the main subject and watercolor to create vibrant colored backgrounds. In a 2018 interview with Ellen Caldwell, Brodell was asked if there were any connections between Kingdom Animalia and other works such as Butch Heroes or The Distant Lands, considering that Kingdom Animalia was significantly different both artistically and stylistically. Brodell mentioned that despite the differences the overarching connection between those works was their “desire to make work that addresses subjects that [they] feel strongly about."

The Distant Lands 
The Distant Lands is a series of sculptures, paintings and drawings made by artist Ria Brodell from 2004-2008.  Brodell was able to create unique works of art with eccentric creatures in peculiar settings. Through the act of observation, they created their drawings to depict the characteristics of the creatures they discovered, in addition to the perceived creatures’ behaviors. Brodell was interviewed by Ellen Caldwell in 2018, where Brodell shared that their interest for this series (along with their other series Kingdom Animalia) was a basic interest of “animals and conservation”. Brodell states they are the only explorer of these boundless locations; therefore, their artwork is their execution of their experiences from observing the creatures that solely inhabit the uncolonized lands. The collection of creatures includes Wormbunnies (social communal animals), the Whale and his friend submarine (go on adventures), the birdmen (manipulative), the Sodmonsters and the Clumps (unappeasable and temperamental).

Honors and awards 
Brodell is a recipient of an Artadia Award, a Massachusetts Cultural Council Artist Fellowship and an SMFA Traveling Fellowship.

Butch Heroes is a finalist in LGBTQ Non-Fiction for a Lambda Literary Award.

Personal life 
Brodell is non-binary and transgender. They use they/them pronouns.

References

Further reading
 Boslaugh, Sarah. "Artist Ria Brodell Offers an Enlightened View on Holy Cards (and History) with 'Butch Heroes.'" Pop Matters, Nov 29, 2018
"Butch Heroes: Q&A with Ria Brodell." MIT Press Blog, Oct 31, 2018
 Caldwell, Ellen C. "A Conversation with Artist and Esteemed Butch Hero Ria Brodell." Riot Material, July 10, 2018
 Kearnan, Scott. "Gender Nonconforming Pioneers." Boston Spirit Magazine, July/August Issue 2017
Sandler, Leah. “Trans artist Ria Brodell transports themself into multiple genders and histories.” Orlando Weekly, February 7, 2018
 Cook, Greg. "Boston Artist Ria Brodell Finds 'Butch Heroes' Buried in the History Books." WBUR, The ARTery, March 21, 2017
 Dugan, Jess T. "Q&A: Ria Brodell." The Strange Fire Collective, July 21, 2016

External links 

MIT contributor page

School of the Museum of Fine Arts at Tufts alumni
Queer artists
American contemporary painters
Cornish College of the Arts alumni
American portrait painters
Living people
American LGBT artists
Non-binary artists
Year of birth missing (living people)
Transgender artists